Phillip Waugh (born 22 September 1979) is a retired Australian rugby union footballer who played 136 matches in Super Rugby for the NSW Waratahs, and in 79 Test matches for the Wallabies. His usual position was openside flanker.

Rugby career
Waugh's career as a rugby player began at the Shore school, playing in the First XV in his final 3 years and captaining the team in 1997. He was selected to represent the Australian Schoolboy's team in 1996 and 1997, captaining the team in 1997.

Waugh's campaign continued in 1998, as he was named in the Australian under 19s Rugby team, and subsequently the under 21s from 1998 to 2000. 

His professional career began in 1999, playing for the Waratahs, and later that year gained selection for the Wallabies Spring tour of the UK and Europe, making his test debut as a replacement in the match against England. Waugh continued receiving game time with the team until early 2002 when an ankle injury caused him to miss out on the international season.

After his recovery, Waugh returned to the field to be named vice-captain of the 2003 Rugby World Cup team, who were ultimately runners-up. He was rewarded for his performance in 2003 by winning the John Eales Medal for the Wallabies Best and Fairest Player.

Waugh was named captain of the Waratahs in 2007 but was injured for most of the Super 14 season. Rocky Elsom and Adam Freier deputized in his absence. During the 2008 Super 14 season, he led the Waratahs from second last (2007 result) to second on the ladder.

Sailing
In December 2013 Waugh was a crew member aboard racing supermaxi yacht Perpetual Loyal in the 2013 Sydney to Hobart Yacht Race, with his other celebrity crew members, Karl Stefanovic, Larry Emdur, Tom Slingsby, Jude Bolton and Guillaume Brahimi.

Honours
 2010 Waratahs Best forward award
 2009 Waratahs Best forward award
 2008 Waratahs Best Forward award
 2004 Matthew Burke Cup – Waratahs Players' Player
 2003 John Eales Medal

See also
 Australian Rugby Shield
 Wallaby Team of the Decade

References

External links
 Waratahs Profile

1979 births
 Australian rugby union players
Australian rugby union captains
 Australia international rugby union players
 New South Wales Waratahs players
 Living people
 Barbarian F.C. players
 Rugby union players from Sydney
 Rugby union flankers
 People educated at Sydney Church of England Grammar School